怪談 may refer to:

 The Unbelievable (1996 TV series) Hong Kong TV show about the paranormal and supernatural in East Asia
 Kaidan (kwaidan) generally ghost story or horror story; restrictedly, traditional Japanese ghost stories and supernatural tales
 Kwaidan (film), 1964 Japanese anthology horror film
 Kaidan (2007 film), 2007 Japanese horror film
 Kwaidan: Stories and Studies of Strange Things (1904 book) Japanese ghost story collection

See also